CFL Cargo Danmark (CFLCD) is a private freight railway company in Denmark and a subsidiary of Luxembourg's CFL Cargo, owned by the national railway company of Luxembourg, Société Nationale des Chemins de Fer Luxembourgeois (CFL) and ArcelorMittal.

The company was founded in August 2004 as Dansk Jernbane ApS (abbreviated DJ and stylized DJ=) as an affiliate to the CFL-owned German company  GmbH (neg) by the CFL subsidiary EuroLuxCargo. EuroLuxCargo was transformed into the CFL/Arcelor Profil Luxembourg joint venture CFL Cargo in 2006, and Dansk Jernbane changed its name to CFL Cargo Danmark in January 2007.

Rail Net Denmark issued the first operator safety certificate to CFL Cargo Danmark on 24 January 2005 to operate freight services on railroad network west of the Great Belt. The certificate was expanded 1 August 2005, to include the whole of Denmark. The company has gained a number of customers throughout the country, in contrast to DB Schenker Rail's steady service reductions in non-transit freight traffic in Denmark. They have done aluminum transports between Grenå and Tønder for Hydro Aluminium, and have operated east of the Great Belt between Odense and Naestved.

Like the defunct freight operators PBS/Eurorail and TraXion, it is run independently of the Danish state.

See also
 Rail transport in Denmark

References

External links
  
 

Railway companies established in 2004
Railway companies of Denmark